Jātismara (Sanskrit: जातिस्मर) means - recollecting a former existence or birth. Such recollection is believed to be a talent which great saints possessed or cultivated.

In the Buddhist Nikāya and Āgama literature there is reference to jātismara as first of the three vidyās ('sciences'), as the fourth of the five abhijñās ('superknowledges') and as the eighth of the ten tathagātadaśabala (powers of a tathagata); it is listed as a faculty connected with the higher stages of meditation as a yogic attainment through control of the body and purity of body and conduct, as the result of abiding in a particular samādhi. The Mahayāna Buddhist literature refers to jātismara not as an individual's meditational development but as effected by a Bodhisattva for improving religious life, or as a religious gain, as an anuśamsa ('blessing') through a third kind of non-meditational activity but connected with the sacred texts and with dhāranīs.

According to the Naradiya Purana observance of Ekadashi Vrata ('fast') can make a sinless person a Jātismara. The Jātismara Vrata requires the fasting person to remain silent until the moon rises. The Vishnu Purana speaks of Shavya who was born a jātismara-daughter of the king of Kāshi.

Bhagavata Purana (III.xxvi.30) tells us that memory is a characteristic of intelligence, that maya clouds intelligence and causes false identification (III.xxxi.20), that a person when born is bereft of memory (III.xxxi.23) when all wisdom gained in the past birth(s) is lost (III.xxxi.24). Memory is the link between body and soul. And, the Mahabharata speaks about the place the four seas meet bathing where one has immunity from misfortune; bathing then in Jatismara with pure mind and senses one acquires the recollections of his former life.

References

Sanskrit words and phrases
Hindu philosophical concepts
Buddhist philosophical concepts